Sporting Clube de Portugal Superleague Formula team is the racing team of Sporting Clube de Portugal, a football team that competes in Portugal in the Portuguese Liga. The Sporting Clube de Portugal racing team competed in the Superleague Formula. It made its debut in the 2009 season and was operated by motorsport team Zakspeed, who have also participated in Formula One.

2009 season
Pedro Petiz was the driver of the Sporting Clube de Portugal entry. The highlight of Sporting's season happened at the Monza round where they won their first race.

Record
(key)

2009
Super Final results in 2009 did not count for points towards the main championship.

2010

References

External links
 Sporting CP Superleague Formula team minisite
 Official Sporting CP football club website

Sporting CP sports
Superleague Formula club teams
2009 establishments in Portugal